Víctor Rivas Goire (born April 30, 1992), also known as Victor Rivas,  is a Cuban professional baseball first baseman. Rivas played for the Cuban National Baseball Team in two international competitions. At age 17 he debuted on the Cuban National Team adult roster, where he played two seasons. At age 19 he attempted to defect from Cuba in 2011, seeking a career in MLB, was unsuccessful in that attempt and was banned by the Cuban government and from participating in baseball for two years. Rivas attempted a second time and was banned from playing baseball one more year. He then leaves the island legally a third time to Haiti where he established residency.

Cuban career and defection
Rivas played for the Cuban National Baseball Team in the 2010 World Junior Baseball Championship, during which he stole home on a wild pitch. The International Baseball Federation acknowledged Rivas as the premier player for the Cuban National Team. Cuba won the bronze medal. Rivas also played briefly in the Cuban National Series for Isla de la Juventud in addition to the 2009 World Junior Championship in Barquisimeto, Venezuela.  

He played on the Cuban roster with Jorge Soler, Raisel Iglesias, Yandy Dias, Jesus Balager, Omar Luis and Yander La Oss; all of whom signed professional contracts with Major League Baseball Organizations and are currently playing in the Major Leagues, AA and AAA in the minor leagues. 

Rivas defected from Cuba in 2013 to pursue his career in Major League Baseball (MLB). During his training in the Dominican Republic, many teams visited and watched Rivas practice. Numerous MLB teams had strong interest in signing him, but he did not have his free agent clearance with MLB, with the primary reason due to lack of guidance, improper management and negligence with the process of his paperwork. Rivas is living in the United States and under new agent representation. He is an eligible international free agent with clearance to sign immediately sign with an MLB organization and currently possesses a valid work permit which he recently received from the offices of the USCIS, United States Citizenship and Immigration Services.

Scouting profile
He is described as a heavy-hitting infielder who would play first base. Steve Fiorindo, of The Prospect Pipeline, described Rivas in 2015 as a "strong kid. Pretty loud off the bat." According to the IBAF he is acknowledged as the premier player for the Cuban National Team, there were a lot of good players to watch, but beware of Victor Rivas. The IBAF went on describing Rivas as having proved himself very productive with the bat. Rivas is a power asset on any AA or AAA minor league roster, for any MLB team in need of an aggressive international player with exceptional offensive skills. Current bat velocity 108 miles per hour.

See also

List of baseball players who defected from Cuba

References

External links
 Career statistics and player information from Baseball-Reference
 
 
 Homepage of Victor Rivas, Cuban baseball player

1992 births
Living people
Defecting Cuban baseball players
Isla de la Juventud players
Mexican League baseball first basemen
People from Isla de la Juventud
Rojos del Águila de Veracruz players